Robert Sherwood Bailey (October 13, 1942 – January 9, 2018) was an American professional baseball third baseman. He played 17 seasons in Major League Baseball (MLB) between 1962 and 1978 for the Pittsburgh Pirates, Los Angeles Dodgers, Montreal Expos, Cincinnati Reds, and Boston Red Sox.

Early life
Bailey attended Wilson Classical High School, where he was the 1961 CIF Baseball Player of the Year and quarterbacked the football team for two years, one of which was undefeated.

Career
He was originally signed by the Pittsburgh Pirates as a bonus baby. After the 1966 season, the Pirates traded Bailey and Gene Michael to the Los Angeles Dodgers for Maury Wills.
 
In a 17-season career, Bailey posted a .257 batting average with 189 home runs and 773 Runs batted in in 1931 games played. Bailey batted fifth in the inaugural game of the Montreal Expos versus the New York Mets on April 8, 1969, going 2-for-4 with two RBIs and one walk in the 11-10 win. Bailey led the National League in Double Plays turned by a Third baseman in 1963, Double Plays turned by a Left fielder in 1974 and Fielding percentage by a Third baseman in 1971.

He was acquired by the Reds from the Expos for Clay Kirby on December 12, 1975.

Later life
After his playing days were over, Bailey was a minor league manager and hitting instructor, most notably in the Montreal Expos organization. In 1987, he was the final manager of the Hawaii Islanders.

Bailey died on January 9, 2018, at the age of 75.

References

External links

1942 births
2018 deaths
American expatriate baseball players in Canada
Asheville Tourists players
Baseball coaches from California
Baseball players from Long Beach, California
Birmingham Barons managers
Boston Red Sox players
Cincinnati Reds players
Columbus Jets players
Hawaii Islanders managers
Los Angeles Dodgers players
Major League Baseball third basemen
Montreal Expos players
Pittsburgh Pirates players
Sportspeople from Long Beach, California
Wilson Classical High School alumni